Mekonnen Gebremedhin Woldegiorg (born 11 October 1988, in Addis Ababa) is an Ethiopian middle distance runner, who specializes in the 1500 metres. He is known for consistently placing close to the top three in each Diamond League competition he makes an appearance in.

Gebremedhin finished sixth at the 2008 World Indoor Championships, fourth at the 2010 IAAF World Indoor Championships and third at the 2012 IAAF World Indoor Championships. His personal best time is 3:31.57, achieved in 2010 in Berlin. He is the bronze medallist from the 2012 IAAF World Indoor Championships in Istanbul, Turkey.

International competitions

Personal bests
Outdoor
800 metres – 1:46.63 (Madrid 2012)
1500 metres – 3:31.45 (Hengelo 2012)
One mile – 3:49.70 (Eugene 2011)
3000 metres – 7:41.42 (Milan 2011)
3000 metres steeplechase – 8:59.06 (Kawasaki 2012)
Indoor
1500 metres – 3:34.89 (Birmingham 2012)
3000 metres – 7:41.59 (Ghent 2013)

External links
International Association of Athletics Federation (iaaf)
Samsung Diamond League
All Athletics

1988 births
Living people
Ethiopian male middle-distance runners
Ethiopian male steeplechase runners
Olympic athletes of Ethiopia
Athletes (track and field) at the 2012 Summer Olympics
Athletes (track and field) at the 2016 Summer Olympics
Athletes (track and field) at the 2015 African Games
Athletes from Addis Ababa
World Athletics Championships athletes for Ethiopia
African Games gold medalists for Ethiopia
African Games medalists in athletics (track and field)